Alvite is a former civil parish in the municipality of Cabeceiras de Basto, Portugal. In 2013, the parish merged into the new parish Alvite e Passos.

References

Freguesias of Cabeceiras de Basto
Former parishes of Portugal